The 2016 Kremlin  Cup (also known as the 2016 VTB Kremlin Cup for sponsorship reasons) was a tennis tournament played on indoor hard courts. It was the 27th edition of the Kremlin Cup for the men and the 21st edition for the women. The tournament was part of the ATP World Tour 250 Series of the 2016 ATP World Tour, and of the Premier series of the 2016 WTA Tour. It was held at the Olympic Stadium in Moscow, Russia, from 17 October through 23 October 2016.

On 15 October, a record high of 4800 people visited the qualifying rounds; according to Tarpishchev, in no other tennis tournament was that number so high.

ATP singles main-draw entrants

Seeds

 Rankings are as of October 10, 2016

Other entrants
The following players received wildcards into the singles main draw:
  Cem İlkel 
  Karen Khachanov
  Konstantin Kravchuk

The following players received entry from the qualifying draw:
  Alexander Bublik 
  Aslan Karatsev 
  Daniil Medvedev
  Jürgen Melzer

The following player received entry as a lucky loser:
  Federico Gaio

Withdrawals
Before the tournament
  Bernard Tomic →replaced by  Evgeny Donskoy
  Jiří Veselý →replaced by   Lukáš Rosol
  Martin Kližan →replaced by  Federico Gaio

Retirements
  Marcel Granollers
  Aslan Karatsev
  Mikhail Kukushkin

ATP doubles main-draw entrants

Seeds

1 Rankings are as of October 10, 2016

Other entrants
The following pairs received wildcards into the doubles main draw:
  Evgeny Donskoy /  Teymuraz Gabashvili
  Daniil Medvedev /  Andrey Rublev

Withdrawals
During the tournament
  Marcel Granollers

WTA singles main-draw entrants

Seeds

 Rankings are as of October 10, 2016

Other entrants
The following players received wildcards into the singles main draw:
  Anna Kalinskaya
  Svetlana Kuznetsova

The following players received entry from the qualifying draw:
  Anna Blinkova
  Nicole Gibbs
  Kateřina Siniaková
  Lesia Tsurenko

The following player entered as a lucky loser:
  Ana Konjuh

Withdrawals
Before the tournament
  Sara Errani →replaced by  Anastasija Sevastova
  Karolína Plíšková →replaced by  Shelby Rogers
  Monica Puig →replaced by  Danka Kovinić
  Dominika Cibulková →replaced by   Ana Konjuh
During the tournament
  Anna Blinkova

Retirements
  Carla Suárez Navarro

WTA doubles main-draw entrants

Seeds

1 Rankings are as of October 10, 2016

Other entrants
The following pairs received wildcards into the doubles main draw:
  Anna Kalinskaya /  Olesya Pervushina
  Natela Dzalamidze /  Veronika Kudermetova

Champions

Men's singles

  Pablo Carreño Busta def.  Fabio Fognini, 4–6, 6–3, 6–2

Women's singles

  Svetlana Kuznetsova def.  Daria Gavrilova, 6–2, 6–1

Men's doubles

  Juan Sebastián Cabal /  Robert Farah def.  Julian Knowle /  Jürgen Melzer, 7–5, 4–6, [10–5]

Women's doubles

  Andrea Hlaváčková /  Lucie Hradecká def.  Daria Gavrilova /  Daria Kasatkina, 4–6, 6–0, [10–7]

References

External links
 

2016
Kremlin Cup
Kremlin Cup
Kremlin Cup
Kremlin Cup
Kremlin Cup